There were three Treaties of Aix-la-Chapelle. Although "Aix-la-Chapelle", the French name of the German city of Aachen, is an exonym now rarely used in English, the name Treaty of Aachen is rarely used.
Pax Nicephori, also sometimes called Treaty of Aix-la-Chapelle of 812, Byzantine recognition of the Carolingian empire
Treaty of Aix-la-Chapelle (1668), ending the War of Devolution
Treaty of Aix-la-Chapelle (1748), ending the War of the Austrian Succession
Treaty of Aachen (2019) (aka Aachen Treaty), successor to the Élysée Treaty of 1963 between Germany and France

See also
Congress of Aix-la-Chapelle (disambiguation)